Corinne Russell (born 22 November 1963) is an English former Page 3 Girl, glamour model and dancer during the 1980s.

Modelling career 
Russell made her Page 3 debut in The Sun on 22 August 1982, and first appearing in the Daily Star on 7 September, notching up 189 appearances in total (118 in The Sun and 71 in the Daily Star), before making her final appearances in The Sun on 27 September, and 8 October 1990 in the Daily Star respectively.

TV work 
She became one of the "Hill's Angels" on the 1983 cycle of The Benny Hill Show. Also in 1983 she was part of Flick Colby's Zoo dancers on Top Of The Pops, featuring heavily in the dance to "Waiting On A Train" by Flash And The Pan on 02.06.83. She later became a regular on the third series of The Kenny Everett Television Show in 1985. Later, in 1989, she had a nonspeaking role in Dennis Potter's adaptation of Blackeyes.She appears in one episode of In Sickness & In Health(se4ep4) in a non speaking role.

Film work 
Her film work includes Absolute Beginners as the Giant Typewriter Dancer and a small speaking role in Highlander as the hooker "Candy". Russell was chosen to dance in silhouette during the opening credits of the 1983 James Bond film Octopussy. She also had a speaking role in the TV movie Harry's Kingdom as the car model "Suzi Lake". She had a minor role in Bolero.

Music video work 
She led other leather-clad women with zippers at the groin region of their suits in the AC/DC music video "You Shook Me All Night Long". It was revealed on the VH1 series Pop-up Video that during the shot with the mechanical bull, she accidentally jabbed herself with her spur twice. The roadie who came to her aid married her a year later; Angus, one of the band members, gave them a mechanical bull for a wedding present as a joke. They later divorced.

Video games 
She appeared on the cover of the 1988 video game Vixen and her movements were recorded in an early use of motion capture technology to create the animation for the main character .

Filmography

References

External links 
 

1963 births
Page 3 girls
People from Birmingham, West Midlands
Living people